Šiljeg is a Croatian surname. The surname has etymological origin in the Albanian word shilege, meaning a one-year-old ram. Notable people with the surname include:

 Viktor Šiljeg, Croatian footballer

See also 

 Ćavar, a Croatian surname of similar etymological meaning

Croatian surnames
Slavic-language surnames
Surnames of Albanian origin